4-trimethylaminobutyraldehyde dehydrogenase is an enzyme that in humans is encoded by the ALDH9A1 gene.

Function 

This protein belongs to the aldehyde dehydrogenase family of proteins. It has a high activity for oxidation of gamma-aminobutyraldehyde and other amino aldehydes. The enzyme catalyzes the dehydrogenation of gamma-aminobutyraldehyde to gamma-aminobutyric acid (GABA). This isozyme is a tetramer of identical 54-kD subunits.

References

External links

Further reading